The Sequoia Union High School District is a public union school district in the San Francisco Bay Area, primarily serving the southern San Mateo County communities of Atherton, Belmont, East Palo Alto, Ladera, San Carlos, Menlo Park, Portola Valley, Redwood City, and Woodside. The District currently serves more than 9,000 students, and also owns the radio station KCEA.

Schools 
High Schools:
Sequoia High School, founded in 1895 in Redwood City
Menlo-Atherton High School, founded in 1951 in Atherton
Carlmont High School, founded in 1952 in Belmont
Woodside High School, founded in 1958 in Woodside
East Palo Alto Academy, founded in 2001 in East Palo Alto
Summit Preparatory Charter High School, founded in 2003 in Redwood City
Everest Public High School, founded in 2009 in Redwood City
TIDE Academy, founded in 2019 in Menlo Park
Ravenswood High School, founded in 1958 and closed in 1976 due to low enrollment and racial tension (today the site of the Gateway 101 Shopping Center)
San Carlos High School, founded in 1960 and closed in 1982 due to low enrollment (today the site of Highlands Park)
Other Schools:
 Redwood Continuation High School, in Redwood City
 Cañada Middle College, in Redwood City
 Sequoia Adult School, in Menlo Park

Governance 
Superintendent

 Crystal Leach, Interim Superintendent (December 15, 2022–present)
 Formerly Darnise Williams (April 2021–December 14, 2022)
 Formerly Crystal Leach as Interim Superintendent (2020–2021, 1 school year)
 Formerly Mary Streshly (2017–2020, 3+ school years)
 Formerly James Lianides (2010–2017, 7 school years)
 Formerly Patrick "Pat" Gemma (2003–2010, 7 school years)

Board of Trustees

The SUHSD Board of Trustees are elected by 5 districts, each representing a different geographic area served by the district. The trustees include:

 Amy Koo, Trustee Area A
 Carrie Du Bois, Trustee Area B
 Richard Ginn, Trustee Area C
 Sathvik Nori, Trustee Area D
 Shawneece Stevenson, Trustee Area E

Controversy 
In 2018, former Vice Principal Jennifer Cho of Carlmont High School was investigated by the district for inappropriate relationships with male students. During this investigation, spurred by a Change.org petition signed by thousands of Carlmont High School students, Cho was placed on administrative leave before being relocated elsewhere in the district.

On August 3, 2020, the Sequoia District Teachers Association announced a vote of no-confidence in Sequoia Union High School District Superintendent Mary Streshly's leadership, and asked for her removal from office. In the letter, teachers and administrators accused Streshly of mishandling the district's Covid-19 response. Along with this, it cited her inability to make and communicate plans and her dismissal of racial tensions in the district. The resolution received 200 staff signatures in the first 24 hours and 300 in total, accounting for roughly 60% of the union staff. In September of 2020, Streshly resigned from her post and was succeeded by Crystal Leach who served as interim superintendent for the remainder of the school year while the district searched for a replacement.

See also

Belmont–Redwood Shores School District
San Carlos School District
Redwood City School District
Menlo Park City School District
Woodside Elementary School District
Las Lomitas Elementary School District
Portola Valley Elementary School District
Ravenswood City School District

References

External links

School districts in San Mateo County, California
Menlo Park, California
Education in Redwood City, California
1895 establishments in California
School districts established in 1895